The following lists events that happened during 1959 in the Kingdom of Nepal.

Incumbents
Prime Minister: Subarna Shamsher Rana (until 27 May), Bishweshwar Prasad Koirala (starting 27 May)
Chief Justice: Anirudra Prasad Singh (until 29 June)

Events

February
 February 18 - Elections were held in Nepal for the first time its history, as voters chose candidates for 18 of the 109 lower house seats, with the remainder to be chosen on eight other days.

References

 
1950s in Nepal
Nepal
Nepal
Years of the 20th century in Nepal